Tristan Bernard (7 September 1866 – 7 December 1947) was a French playwright, novelist, journalist and lawyer.

Life

He studied law, and after his military service, he started his career as the manager of an aluminium smelter. In the 1890s, he managed the Vélodrome de la Seine at Levallois-Perret and the Vélodrome Buffalo, events that were an integral part of Parisian life, being regularly attended by personalities such as Toulouse-Lautrec. He reputedly introduced the bell to signify the last lap of a race.

He identified as an anarchist.

Works

Plays
Les Pieds nickelés (1895)
 (French Without a Master) (1899)
Triplepatte (with André Godfernaux, 1905)
The Brighton Twins (Les Jumeaux de Brighton) (1908)
Le Danseur inconnu (1909)
Le Costaud des épinettes (with Alfred Athis, 1910)
The Little Cafe (Le petit café) (1911)
Les Deux Canards (with Alfred Athis, 1913)
Jeanne Doré (1913)
Le Cordon bleu (1923)
Embrassez-moi (with Gustave Quinson and Yves Mirande, 1923)

Narrative works
Vous m'en direz tant (1894) collaboration with Pierre Veber
Contes de Pantruche et d'ailleurs (1897)
Sous toutes réserves (1898)
Mémoires d'un jeune homme rangé (1899)
Un mari pacifique (1901)
Amants et voleurs (1905)
Mathilde et ses mitaines (1912)
L'Affaire Larcier (1924)
Le Voyage imprévu (1928)
Aux abois (1933)
Robin des bois (1935)

Filmography
Jeanne Doré, directed by Louis Mercanton and René Hervil (1915, based on the play Jeanne Doré)
The Love Cheat, directed by George Archainbaud (1919, based on the play Le Danseur inconnu)
The Little Cafe, directed by Raymond Bernard (1919, based on the play The Little Cafe)
Triplepatte, directed by Raymond Bernard (1922, based on the play Triplepatte)
Le Costaud des épinettes, directed by Raymond Bernard (1923, based on the play Le Costaud des épinettes)
Kiss Me, directed by Robert Péguy (1929, based on the play Embrassez-moi)
The Unknown Dancer, directed by René Barberis (1929, based on the play Le Danseur inconnu)
Playboy of Paris, directed by Ludwig Berger (1930, based on the play The Little Cafe)
The Little Cafe, directed by Ludwig Berger (1931, based on the play The Little Cafe)
Le Poignard malais, directed by Roger Goupillières (1931, based on a short story)
, directed by Robert Boudrioz (1931, based on the play )
The Champion Cook, directed by Karl Anton (1932, based on the play Le Cordon bleu)
, directed by Anatole Litvak (1932, based on the play Coeur de lilas)
Kiss Me, directed by Léon Mathot (1932, based on the play Embrassez-moi)
Les Deux Canards, directed by Erich Schmidt (1934, based on the play Les Deux Canards)
, directed by Jean de Limur (1935, based on the novel Le Voyage imprévu)
Runaway Ladies, directed by Jean de Limur (1938, based on the novel Le Voyage imprévu)
, directed by Raymond Bernard (1935, based on the play Le Costaud des épinettes)
The Brighton Twins, directed by Claude Heymann (1936, based on the play The Brighton Twins)
, directed by Mario Bonnard (Italy, 1938, based on the play Jeanne Doré)
The Last Metro, directed by Maurice de Canonge (1945, based on the novel Mathilde et ses mitaines)

Screenwriter
 (dir. Jacques Feyder and Raymond Bernard, 1917)
L'Homme inusable (dir. Raymond Bernard, 1923)
Décadence et grandeur (dir. Raymond Bernard, 1923)
The Fortune (dir. , 1931)
 (dir. André Berthomieu, 1938)
Girls in Distress (dir. G. W. Pabst, 1939)

References

External links

 

1866 births
1947 deaths
Writers from Besançon
19th-century French journalists
20th-century French journalists
19th-century French Jews
French people of World War II
19th-century French dramatists and playwrights
20th-century French dramatists and playwrights
19th-century French novelists
20th-century French novelists
20th-century French male writers
Burials at Passy Cemetery
French anarchists
Lycée Condorcet alumni
French male non-fiction writers